Sultan Muhammed Mansur Ahmed is a Bangladeshi politician. He was vice president of Dhaka University Central Students' Union. In 2018 Bangladesh general election he contested from Moulvibazar-2 as a candidate of Jatiya Oikya Front and won the seat.

Early life
He studied in Murari Chand College. He then graduated from Dhaka University.

Career
He was the president of the Bangladesh Chhatra League, the student wing of the Awami League, from 1985 to 1988. Then he became the vice president of Dhaka University Central Students' Union. After being elected as a Member of Parliament he was chosen as the Organising Secretary of Bangladesh Awami League. Currently he is the Member of Parliament from Moulvibazar-2 constituency.

References

Living people
People from Kulaura Upazila
Gano Forum politicians
11th Jatiya Sangsad members
1956 births